PB-21 Hubis a constituency of the Provincial Assembly of Balochistan.

See also
 PB-20 Khuzdar-III
 PB-22 Lasbela

References

External links
 AK Lasbela Result
 Election commission Pakistan's official website
 Awazoday.com check result
 Balochistan's Assembly official site

Constituencies of Balochistan